Mariama Keïta (1946 – 29 October 2018) was Niger's first woman journalist and feminist activist.

Biography 
Keïta was born in 1946 in Niamey. She began as an editor and presenter of a newspaper and on the public radio station La Voix du Sahel. In 1993, she participated in the popularization of the Constitution of Niger, which allowed the holding of the first democratic elections of the country.

From 2003 to 2006, Keïta was the president of the Higher Council of Communication (CSC), the body responsible for the regulation of the country's media. During her last years of her career, she worked as the director of La Voix du Sahel. She is the first Nigerien woman to be a journalist at a time when the profession was considered exclusively for men in Niger.

A feminist activist and figure, she was a pioneer in the defense of women's rights in Niger. She is the coordinator of non-governmental organizations and women's associations in Niger, a group of about fifty structures. She is also the head of one of the country's first NGOs, the Association for Democracy, Freedom and Development.

Keïta died in Turkey on 29 October 2018, at the age of 72, following a long illness.

References 

1946 births
2018 deaths
People from Niamey
Nigerien journalists
Nigerien women journalists
Nigerian human rights activists